The Open Protein Structure Annotation Network (TOPSAN) is a wiki designed to collect, share and distribute information about protein three-dimensional structures The site runs on the MindTouch software.

See also
 Protein structure

References

External links
 http://www.topsan.org.

Biological databases
Protein structure
Wikis